Formica geradi is a species of ant that is one of two species of the subgenus Formica (Serviformica). The species is mainly distributed to mainland Europe. First described as Iberoformica gerardi in 1917 by Bondroit, it is now considered to be within Formica.

References

Formicinae
Hymenoptera of Europe
Insects described in 1917